Gajendra Bahadur Mahat is a Nepalese Politician and serving as the Member Of House Of Representatives (Nepal) elected from Jumla-1, Province No. 6. He is member of the Communist Party of Nepal (Maoist Centre).

References

Living people
Nepal MPs 2017–2022
Nepal Communist Party (NCP) politicians
Nepal Workers Peasants Party politicians
Communist Party of Nepal (Maoist Centre) politicians
1968 births